V Sport Hockey is a sports channel that is broadcasting from the United Kingdom, primarily targeting Sweden but also available in Finland and Norway.  Broadcasting was commenced on 1 September 2009, at the start of the 2009 ice hockey season. The channel focuses on the KHL, HockeyAllsvenskan, Kvalserien, Ice Hockey World Championships and NHL.

The launch of the channel was announced 7 May 2009 during the 2009 Men's World Ice Hockey Championships. The channel is included in the Viasat sports package via satellite. The channel is available through the cable- and broadband networks, and the games from HockeyAllsvenskan shown on TV are available through the streaming service Viasat OnDemand.

In 2011, the channel ceased operations in the Baltics.

In 2017, the channel became a part of Viasport in Norway.

In 2020, the channel was renamed V Sport Hockey.

References

Television channels in Sweden
V Sport
Ice hockey mass media
Television channels and stations established in 2009